Acanthochitona thileniusi is a very rare species of chiton in the family Acanthochitonidae. The only specimens have been found in Tauranga Harbour in New Zealand.

References
 Powell A. W. B., New Zealand Mollusca, William Collins Publishers Ltd, Auckland, New Zealand 1979 

Acanthochitonidae
Molluscs described in 1909